On December 18, 2022, an incident involving United Airlines Flight 1722 occurred, in which the plane dropped to  above the Pacific Ocean. The incident happened 71 seconds after the flight took off from Kahului Airport in Maui, en route to San Francisco.

The weather conditions in Hawaii were particularly harsh at the time of the take-off, with flash flood warnings, high surf, and gale warnings. The pilots filed a safety report after landing at San Francisco at 9:03 p.m. local time. The Federal Aviation Administration and the Air Line Pilots Association conducted an investigation, which resulted in the pilots consenting to receive additional training. The pilots had 25,000 hours of flying experience between them and fully cooperated with the investigation.

The reason for the incident was unknown. On February 14, 2023, the NTSB announced that they would investigate the incident and have the results within 3 weeks. 

There were no injuries reported.

References 

Aviation accidents and incidents in the United States in 2022
United Airlines accidents and incidents
December 2022 events in the United States
2022 in Hawaii